Salim Effendi al-Husayni (unknown birth–1908)  was Mayor of Jerusalem from 1882 to 1897. Hussein al-Husayni and Mousa Kazim al-Husayni, later mayors of the city, were his sons. He was a member of the Jerusalem Council and belonged to the prominent al-Husayni clan of Jerusalem. He built a palace in the city, which his granddaughter Hind al-Husseini later developed into the Dar al-Tifl Institution. Al-Husayni died in 1908 and is buried in the neighborhood of Sheikh Jarrah, near the American Colony Hotel.

He is praised in The Diaries of Wasif Jawhariyyeh, a memoir of a Jerusalem resident under his mayorship.

References

Meron Benvenisti, City of Stone: The Hidden History of Jerusalem, 1996, 

1908 deaths
Arabs in Ottoman Palestine
Mayors of Jerusalem
Palestinian politicians
Salim
Year of birth missing
19th-century Arabs